There are at least 66 named lakes and reservoirs in Sanders County, Montana.

Lakes
 Acorn Lake, el. 
 Arrowhead Lake, el. 
 Baldy Lake, el. 
 Banana Lake, el. 
 Bass Pond, el. 
 Bear Lake, el. 
 Beaver Lake, el. 
 Beaver Lake, el. 
 Berry Lake, el. 
 Blossom Lakes, el. 
 Buck Lake, el. 
 Burgess Lake, el. 
 Cabin Lake, el. 
 Carbine Lake, el. 
 Cliff Lake, el. 
 Copper Lake, el. 
 Corona Lake, el. 
 Crescent Lake, el. 
 Deer Lake, el. 
 Duckhead Lake, el. 
 East Lake, el. 
 Elk Lake, el. 
 Engle Lake, el. 
 Evans Lake, el. 
 Fishtrap Lake, el. 
 Frog Lake, el. 
 Goat Lakes, el. 
 Grass Lake, el. 
 Graves Lake, el. 
 Grouse Lake, el. 
 Honeymoon Lake, el. 
 Image Lake, el. 
 Isabella Lake, el. 
 Knowles Lake, el. 
 Lawn Lake, el. 
 Little Ibex Lake, el. 
 Lower Thompson Lake, el. 
 Marmot Lakes, el. 
 Ninetythree Mile Lake, el. 
 Outlaw Lake, el. 
 Pear Lake, el. 
 Porcupine Lake, el. 
 Quail Lake, el. 
 Rainbow Lake, el. 
 Rock Lake, el. 
 Rush Lake, el. 
 Saint Paul Lake, el. 
 Schmitz Lakes, el. 
 Smiley Slough, el. 
 Snowshoe Lake, el. 
 Stony Lake, el. 
 Sylvan Lake, el. 
 Terrace Lake, el. 
 Thompson Lakes, el. 
 Tuffys Lake, el. 
 Twin Lakes, el. 
 Upper Fishtrap Lake, el. 
 Upper Lake, el. 
 Wanless Lake, el. 
 Winniemuck Lake, el.

Reservoirs
 Cabinet Gorge Reservoir, el. 
 Dry Fork Reservoir, el. 
 Noxon Rapids Reservoir, el. 
 Noxon Reservoir, el. 
 Thompson Falls Reservoir, el. 
 Upper Dry Fork Reservoir, el.

See also
 List of lakes in Montana

Notes

Bodies of water of Sanders County, Montana
Sanders